Natanzi is one of the Central Iranian varieties of Iran, one of five listed in Ethnologue that together have 35,000 speakers. Dialects are Natanzi, Farizandi, Yarandi/Yarani. It is closely related to Sohi.

References

Western Iranian languages